Avrohom Blumenkrantz (Oct 21 1944 – February 22, 2007) was a prominent American Orthodox rabbi. He was a widely consulted authority on the laws of Passover kashrut and published an annual Passover guide for many years.

Early life
Avrohom Blumenkrantz was born in Mandatory Palestine to parents of Ashkenazi European extraction, Chaim Menachem Bentzion and Devorah. His father was a highly trained talmudic scholar from Warsaw, who attended some of the best yeshivas in pre-war Europe, including the Novardok yeshiva. In 1948, Chaim was abroad at the outbreak of the War of Independence, and chose not to return. Instead, young Avrohom and the rest of the family left Israel aboard a ship. In the early 1950s the family settled in Bogotá, Colombia, where Chaim became chief rabbi.

Avrohom began his education in Bogotá, but came to New York City as a teenager to study at Mesivtha Tifereth Jerusalem (MTJ) under Moshe Feinstein, with whom Blumenkrantz would maintain a close relationship until Feinstein's death in 1986.

Rabbinical career
Blumenkrantz became a confidant of Feinstein, screening his calls and filtering the constant stream of halakhic (Jewish law) questions posed to the posek. Feinstein asked his 25-year-old student to teach a semikhah (rabbinic ordination) class in Yoreh De'ah at MTJ. Afterwards, Feinstein directed his student to prominent teaching positions in Staten Island and  Brooklyn.

Following in his father's footsteps, Blumenkrantz took the helm of a synagogue in Far Rockaway, Queens.

Passover guide

Blumenkrantz is best remembered for his annual Passover guide, The Laws of Pesach, a publication relied upon by observant Jews throughout North America to maintain high standards of kashrut observance during Passover. Blumenkrantz would update the guide annually, to reflect changes in the food industry: new products, new ingredients, changes in food preparation methods, etc. The guide began as an unpublished newsletter that Blumenkrantz began to privately distribute in the 1970s. As the circulation of the newsletter spread, more and more people consulted him on complicated questions of Passover observance. As a result of this, Blumenkrantz expanded the coverage of his newsletter until it became book-length, a yearly undertaking that took several months to put together. Blumenkrantz was working on the 2007 volume of the guide at the time of his death. His family announced that the work would be completed in time for Passover. The family continued to publish the Passover Guide in his memory annually.

Personal life
Blumenkrantz was married to Shaindel (née Braunstein) and they had 15 children together.

His son, Yisroel Blumenkrantz is the rabbi of Bais Medrash Ateres Yisroel, the synagogue his father founded in Far Rockaway.

Death and burial
Blumenkrantz died in New York on February 22, 2007, of heart complications. He was flown to Israel for burial in the Mount of Olives Jewish Cemetery in Jerusalem.

Sources
Gershon Tannenbaum, Rabbi Avrohom Blumenkrantz zt”l (1944-2007) Kashrus Champion, The Jewish Press, February 28, 2007
Yair Hoffman, Obituary of Rabbi Avrohom Blumenkrantz, Five Towns Jewish Times, March 1, 2007
T. Silber, Remembering Harav Avraham Blumenkrantz zt"l: A Renowned Rav, Posek, and Mentor, Hamodia (New York), February 28, 2007

1944 births
2007 deaths
American Haredi rabbis
Orthodox rabbis from New York City
Writers from Queens, New York
Colombian emigrants to the United States
Deaths from diabetes
Burials at the Jewish cemetery on the Mount of Olives
People from Far Rockaway, Queens
20th-century American rabbis
21st-century American Jews